Johnathan D. Hershey is an American politician serving as a member of the Pennsylvania House of Representatives from the 82nd district. Elected in November 2018, he assumed office on December 1, 2018

Early life and education 
Born in Mifflintown, Pennsylvania, Hershey graduated from Juniata High School in 2011. He earned a Bachelor of Arts degree in economics and international relations from Messiah University in 2015.

Career 
Hershey began his career working for a non-profit organization in East Africa. He later served in the office of Congressman Charlie Dent. He was elected to the Pennsylvania House of Representatives in November 2018 and assumed office on December 1, 2018.

Hershey currently sits on the Agriculture & Rural Affairs, Appropriations, Government Oversight, Health, and Judiciary committees.

References 

Living people
People from Juniata County, Pennsylvania
Republican Party members of the Pennsylvania House of Representatives
Messiah University alumni
Year of birth missing (living people)